WTFC can refer to one of the following association football clubs:

English clubs:
 Wadebridge Town F.C.
 Walsall Town F.C., one of two clubs that merged to form Walsall F.C.
 Wantage Town F.C.
 Warrington Town F.C.
 Whitby Town F.C.
 Whitstable Town F.C.
 Witham Town F.C.
 Wivenhoe Town F.C.
 Worksop Town F.C.

Nigerian club:
 Wikki Tourists F.C.

Northern Irish club:
 Warrenpoint Town F.C.